Cheshmeh Ali (also Romanized as Cheshmeh ‘Alī) is a village in Kakasharaf Rural District, in the Central District of Khorramabad County, Lorestan Province, Iran. At the 2006 census, its population was 314, in 50 families.

References 

Towns and villages in Khorramabad County